Disastro is the debut and only studio album by English producer Sonny J. It was released 16 June 2008 in United Kingdom, 19 August the same year in the US and was later also available on iTunes 15 September. The singles from the album are "Can't Stop Moving" (which was later re-released as a remix by Mirwais and then reached #40 in UK #8 in Japan), "Enfant Terrible" and "Handsfree" (which reached #77 in the UK Singles Chart).

Track listing
 "Enfant Terrible" – 3:38
 "I'm So Heavy" – 4:04
 "Handsfree (If You Hold My Hand)" featuring Donna Hightower – 3:45
 "Cabaret Short Circuit" – 4:22
 "Belly Bongo" – 3:25
 "Sorrow" – 5:13
 "Can't Stop Moving" – 3:03
 "Strange Things" – 4:10
 "Doing the Tango" – 3:37
 "No-Fi" – 3:33
 "Disastro" – 3:37
 "Sonrise" – 6:29

References

2008 albums
Sonny J albums